Japan competed at the 1960 Summer Olympics in Rome, Italy. 162 competitors, 142 men and 20 women, took part in 96 events in 17 sports. As the country hosted the next Olympics in Tokyo, the Japanese flag was raised at the closing ceremony.

Medalists

| width=78% align=left valign=top |

| width=22% align=left valign=top |

Athletics

Basketball

Boxing

Cycling

Five male cyclists represented Japan in 1960.

Individual road race
 Masashi Omiya

1000m time trial
 Tetsuo Osawa

Team pursuit
 Tetsuo Osawa
 Kanji Kubomura
 Nobuhira Takanuki
 Katsuya Saito

Diving

Equestrian

Fencing

Five fencers, all men, represented Japan in 1960.

Men's foil
 Mitsuyuki Funamizu
 Heizaburo Okawa
 Kazuhiko Tabuchi

Men's team foil
 Heizaburo Okawa, Mitsuyuki Funamizu, Tsugeo Ozawa, Kazuhiko Tabuchi

Men's épée
 Kazuhiko Tabuchi
 Sonosuke Fujimaki
 Tsugeo Ozawa

Men's team épée
 Heizaburo Okawa, Tsugeo Ozawa, Sonosuke Fujimaki, Kazuhiko Tabuchi

Men's sabre
 Tsugeo Ozawa
 Mitsuyuki Funamizu
 Sonosuke Fujimaki

Men's team sabre
 Sonosuke Fujimaki, Mitsuyuki Funamizu, Tsugeo Ozawa, Kazuhiko Tabuchi

Gymnastics

Hockey

Modern pentathlon

Two male pentathletes represented Japan in 1960.

Individual
 Kazuhiro Tanaka
 Shigeaki Uchino

Rowing

Japan had 14 male rowers participate in two out of seven rowing events in 1960.

 Men's coxed four
 Koji Fukuda
 Hatsuhiko Mizuki
 Shunji Murai
 Naotake Okubo
 Osamu Saito (cox)

 Men's eight
 Kenro Chiba
 Tetsuzo Hirose
 Hironori Itsuki
 Hiroshi Saito
 Tadashi Saito
 Tetsuo Sato
 Shigemi Tamura
 Yosuke Tazaki
 Hiroyuki Misawa (cox)

Sailing

Shooting

Eight shooters represented Japan in 1960. Yoshihisa Yoshikawa won a bronze medal in the 50 metre pistol event.
Men

Swimming

Water polo

Weightlifting

Wrestling

References

External links
Official Olympic Reports
International Olympic Committee results database

Nations at the 1960 Summer Olympics
1960
Summer Olympics